AskMen is a free online men's web portal, with international versions in Australia, Canada, the Middle East, the United Kingdom and the United States. It is owned by Ziff Davis and operates through the IGN Entertainment unit.

History
AskMen was founded in August 1999, created by Ricardo Poupada, Christopher Bellerose Rovny and Luís Rodrigues (all three graduates of Concordia University's John Molson School of Business in Montreal, Canada). The company secured $500,000 in venture capital in 2000 while its main competitor, TheMan.com, obtained $17 million in financing from Highland Capital. In November 2000, TheMan.com shut down operations, providing an opportunity for AskMen to become the largest men's lifestyle website online.
By 2001, AskMen surpassed the other websites in its category to become the largest men's lifestyle website. In 2005, AskMen was acquired by IGN.

In December 2009, the site had an estimated 12 million unique visitors.

Print
In May 2007 AskMen launched a three-book series published by HarperCollins, starting with a book titled From the Bar to the Bedroom.

References

External links
 

IGN
Internet forums
Internet properties established in 1999
Men's websites
Online publishing companies of the United States
Web portals
1999 establishments in Australia